Emma Seligman (born May 3, 1995) is a Canadian film director and screenwriter, best known for their feature directorial debut Shiva Baby (2020).

Career
As a teenager, Emma Seligman contributed film reviews to The Huffington Post. They studied film at New York University Tisch School of the Arts, graduating in May 2017, and is based in New York City. While at NYU they made short films including Lonewoods and 2018's Void and Shiva Baby. Their thesis film, Shiva Baby went to the 2018 South by Southwest film festival. At the same time, they began developing it into a feature film, the 2020 release Shiva Baby. Seligman's films focus on sexual themes, particularly the relationship between women and sex, with the director saying that "women decode sexual messaging from a young age, [and] technology, for example with porn or dating sites, has made the sexual messaging more confusing, and [they're] interested in how women figure it out."

They have discussed their filmmaking process as a very collaborative experience, though they spend a lot of time on writing, and enjoy being able to discuss their work with their actors.

As a screenwriter and director, Seligman has received acclaim for the feature film Shiva Baby. It premiered at the 2020 Toronto International Film Festival (TIFF). Critics have commended it as a debut, with Kristy Puchko of The Playlist writing that "it's astounding this is Seligman's first film, [considering] how masterfully she orchestrates the tension and comedy", and Dana Piccoli for Queer Media Matters praising that "while Seligman is still a relative newcomer to the film world, she handles Shiva Baby like an experienced pro".

Seligman reunited with the lead actor from Shiva Baby, Rachel Sennott again in their second feature film, Bottoms, which headlined the SXSW film festival on March 11, 2023.

Personal life 
Seligman is bisexual and Jewish, and uses she/they pronouns. They were raised in a Reform Judaism Ashkenazi community in Toronto and had their Bat Mitzvah ceremony on Masada in Israel. They moved to Los Angeles in 2021. Before the success of Shiva Baby, She had interned for producers of numerous critically acclaimed movies at a variety of production studios. Even earlier on she was thoroughly  involved in filmmaking by writing film reviews while in highschool for a publication like The Huffington post.  She also served on the Toronto International Film Festival’s select youth committee, where she helped put together film based events.

Filmography

Awards and nominations

See also
 List of female film and television directors
 List of LGBT-related films directed by women

Notes

References

Further reading 

</ref>

External links

1995 births
Living people
21st-century Canadian women writers
21st-century Canadian screenwriters
Bisexual women
Canadian women screenwriters
Canadian women film directors
Film directors from Toronto
LGBT film directors
Bisexual Jews
Canadian LGBT screenwriters
Jewish Canadian filmmakers
Jewish Canadian writers
Jewish women writers
Shiva Baby
Tisch School of the Arts alumni
Writers from Toronto
Canadian bisexual writers
Bisexual screenwriters
21st-century Canadian LGBT people